Diplophos rebainsi, Rebains' portholefish, is a bristlemouth of the family Gonostomatidae, found in the south-east and west Pacific, and the South Atlantic oceans.

References
 
 
 Tony Ayling & Geoffrey Cox, Collins Guide to the Sea Fishes of New Zealand,  (William Collins Publishers Ltd, Auckland, New Zealand 1982) 

Gonostomatidae
Fish described in 1972